Niklas Rubin (born December 23, 1995) is a Swedish professional ice hockey goaltender. He currently plays for Porin Ässät of the Liiga. 

Rubin has previously played for Luleå HF and Frölunda HC in the SHL. Rubin has also played for the Swedish national hockey team.

Career

Professional

Porin Ässät (2022-present) 
In 2022, Niklas Rubin signed a one-year contract to Porin Ässät. On 30 December 2022 Rubin became the first Ässät goalie to be credited with a goal when TPS player Michael Dal Colle scored on his own net.

On January 26, 2023, Porin Ässät announced that Rubin had signed a one-year extension to his contract. Ässät announced the contract of the star goalie on a YouTube video titled "Ihan tavallinen video" (Finnish for "A completely normal video"). The title was later changed to "Niklas Rubin jatkaa Ässissä".

Rubin was injured on February 8, 2023, in a game against Tappara. Rubin came back to the ice rink on March 1, 2023. Rubin won his first game after recovering from the injury when Ässät beat JYP Jyväskylä 3–2.

References

External links
 

1995 births
Living people
Frölunda HC players
Luleå HF players
People from Kungsbacka
Swedish ice hockey goaltenders
Tingsryds AIF players
Sportspeople from Halland County